Goodbear is a sketch comedy double act composed of Joe Barnes and Henry Perryment.

Their 2019 show Dougal was nominated for 'Best Show' at the 2019 Edinburgh Comedy Awards.

Formation
Barnes and Perryment met at Leeds University, where they were members of The Leeds Tealights. In 2012, their Leeds Tealights Edinburgh show Sexy Chubby was directed by Jamie Demetriou.

Edinburgh (2015–present)
Goodbear's debut fringe show was at the 2015 Fringe. Since then, they have received critical acclaim from The Guardian, The Sunday Times, The Telegraph, The Scotsman, Chortle, and many more. Their live shows are directed by George Chilcott, artistic director of Dugout Theatre, and accompanied by an original score by Max Perryment.

In 2019, their show Dougal was nominated for 'Best Comedy Show' at the Dave Edinburgh Comedy Awards, presented by Rose Matafeo and Stephen Fry. In 2020, Dougal was also nominated for a Chortle Award.

References

External links
 Official website

British comedy duos
2015 establishments in the United Kingdom
Performing groups established in 2015